The Grand Mosque of Évry is a mosque in Évry-Courcouronnes, Essonne, France. A cultural center is associated with the building.

History

A process was initiated in the early 1980s to collect funds to build the mosque in Évry. The modest results of this effort led to a search for additional funding from the Persian Gulf states. The Saudi Sheikh Akram Aadja saw that the financing was completed. The first stone was laid in 1984, and construction work began in 1985. Interior decoration was funded by the Hassan II Foundation.

The mosque opened ten years later, in 1995, the same year as the Évry Cathedral. It was the work of the architect Henri Baudot, who has constructed several buildings in Algeria and Tunisia.

See also

 Islam in France

References

External links

  

1995 establishments in France
Buildings and structures in Évry, Essonne
Évry
Mosques completed in 1995
Religion in Essonne